Francis or Frank Fitzpatrick may refer to:

Francis Fitzpatrick (VC) (1859–1933), Irish recipient of the Victoria Cross
Francis G. Fitzpatrick (1903–1992), American politician
Francis W. Fitzpatrick (1863–1931), American architect
Francis Fitzpatrick (entrepreneur), British co-founder of Cosgrove Hall Fitzpatrick Entertainment
Frank Fitzpatrick (born 1961), entrepreneur and composer
Frank Fitzpatrick (footballer) (1932–2003), Australian rules footballer

See also 
 Fitzpatrick (surname)
 Fitzpatrick (disambiguation)